William Agada (born 17 September 1999) is a Nigerian professional footballer who plays as a forward for Major League Soccer club Sporting KC.

Career 

Agada began his playing career with Mighty Jets F.C. of the Nigeria National League.

Agada started his international career in Hapoel Katamon Jerusalem's youth team in 2017/18 season. In the middle of the season he was loaned to Maccabi Tel Aviv youth team. Agada finished the season with a total of 22 league goals for both clubs.
In 2018/19 season he returned to Hapoel Katamon Jerusalem in the Israeli Liga Leumit, and completed two seasons with 8 and 15 league goals.
In 2020/21 season he moved to Hapoel Haifa on loan, and scored 6 league goals.
In 2021/22 Agada returned to Hapoel Katamon Jerusalem, that just changed its name to Hapoel Jerusalem. Agada scored 8 league goals, being the club top scorer, and helped the club staying in the first division.
In the end of 2021/22 season, Agada was transferred to Sporting KC of MLS, from the Israeli Premier League.

References

External links
 

1999 births
Living people
Nigerian footballers
Hapoel Katamon Jerusalem F.C. players
Hapoel Jerusalem F.C. players
Hapoel Haifa F.C. players
Sporting Kansas City players
Liga Leumit players
Israeli Premier League players
Major League Soccer players
Nigerian expatriate footballers
Expatriate footballers in Israel
Expatriate soccer players in the United States
Nigerian expatriate sportspeople in Israel
Nigerian expatriate sportspeople in the United States
Association football forwards